Mary Louisa Willard (May 19, 1898 – April 17, 1993) was internationally recognized for her work in  microscopy and forensic science. She began working at Pennsylvania State University as an assistant in 1921, and retired as professor emerita in 1964. She assisted law enforcement officers throughout her career and after her formal retirement, often without pay.

Education and career 
Mary Louisa Willard was born May 19, 1898, at Moffat Cottage on the Penn State campus, to Joseph Moody Willard and Henrietta Nunn.  Her father was a professor at Pennsylvania State University.

She completed her bachelor's degree in chemistry in 1921, becoming an assistant in the chemistry department. In 1923, when she completed her master's degree in organic chemistry, she was promoted to instructor.  In 1927, she received her doctorate from Cornell University where she worked with William Ridgely Orndorff. She then became an assistant professor at Penn State.  In 1938, she became a full professor.  She officially retired in 1964, becoming a professor emerita, but continued her criminological work.

She published more than 40 articles on chemistry and criminology as well as laboratory manuals on chemical microscopy.  Among her publications was a short monograph on Pioneer Women in Chemistry. She was an assistant editor of the journal Mikrochemie (Mikrochemica Acta), beginning in 1942.

Forensics
Mary Willard specialized in microchemical analysis.  She used a variety of techniques, including infrared and ultraviolet spectroscopy, mass spectrometry, gas chromatography and nuclear magnetic resonance.  Her special focus was the crystallography of deformed crystals.

She became involved with her first criminal case in 1930, when she analyzed alcohol from a Prohibition violation.  Throughout her career she assisted law enforcement officials as an expert witness, often pro bono.
Her investigations included murders, suicides, and automobile accidents.  She was an early proponent of the analysis of hair and blood for the identification of suspected murder weapons. In one case in the 1950s, she determined that hair on a railroad spike was that of a child rather than a dog. For others she measured ballistics, tire tracks, and clay samples from boots. The institutions she assisted included the Sûreté, Scotland Yard, and Interpol, as well as more local law enforcement. According to one estimate she was contacted by law enforcement officials on a daily basis, and appeared in court about once a month. The Pittsburgh Press called her "Lady Sherlock".

Teaching
A founding member of the Iota chapter of Alpha Alpha State Delta Kappa Gamma International on March 1, 1947, she was known for her mentoring of both male and female students. She sometimes had her students gain real-world experience by helping to test materials for the criminal investigations in which she was involved.

Mary Willard died on April 17, 1993.  Her papers are located in the University Archives of Pennsylvania State University.

In 2009, the Mary Willard Trustee Scholarship was created to honor her, giving preference to students majoring in forensic science at Eberly College of Science.

Honors and awards
Willard was a member of the American Chemical Society (1921), the American Institute of Chemists, and the American Association for the Advancement of Science. She received a number of honors, including the following:

 1947, first woman to be chairperson of the analytical and microchemistry division of the ACS
 1955, second woman to be recognized by the Pennsylvania Chapter of the American Institute of Chemists for "outstanding efforts in advancing the professional woman chemist."
 1957, honorary member of the Fraternal Order of Police
 1959, first person to be cited by Penn State for "excellence in teaching"
 1965, received Penn State's Woman of the Year Award
 1965, Honorary member of the Austrian Microchemical Society (fourth U.S. citizen so honored)
 1971, first female member in Alpha Chi Sigma.

References

1898 births
1993 deaths
People from State College, Pennsylvania
20th-century American chemists
American women chemists
Women forensic scientists
20th-century American women scientists
Forensic scientists
Cornell University alumni
Eberly College of Science alumni
Pennsylvania State University faculty
American women academics